Bernard "Bunny" Oxley (16 June 1907 – 7 January 1975) was an English footballer who played as a forward, before becoming a coach and manager.

Career
Having played for his village team Whitwell Old Boys, Oxley signed amateur terms with Chesterfield as an eighteen-year-old in October 1925. Turning professional the following December, Oxley made his Football League debut at the end of the 1925–26 season he spent two seasons as a first-team player before attracting the attention of Sheffield United. The Blades signed Oxley in May 1928 for £1,350 and initially employed him on the right wing but later selected him in a number of attacking positions. He initially formed a strong partnership with Jack Pickering at the start of the 1929–30 season but an operation for appendicitis saw Oxley miss a large number of games. Eventually returning to the first team Oxley's form was inconsistent and he eventually lost his place in 1932.

Oxley remained at United for two more seasons, mainly playing in the reserves, and was eventually sold to cross-town rivals Sheffield Wednesday for £1,000 in May 1934. Unable to find a regular starting place with his new club Oxley moved again to Plymouth Argyle for £600 in September 1935 and again to Stockport County in June 1936.

Oxley's career was revived at County and he featured regularly, helping the side win the Third Division (North) title in 1936–37 season. Dropping into non-league in 1938, Oxley spent a brief time as player-manager with Worksop Town before signing as player-coach with Scunthorpe and Lindley United in November 1938. In 1939 Oxley moved to The Netherlands to coach football and cricket and was appointed coach at HVV Den Haag but was forced to flee in 1940 following the German invasion.

Returning to England Oxley spent some time playing with Wombwell Athletic before being appointed manager of Worksop Town in 1947 after which he acted as a scout for Leyton Orient.

Personal life
Born in Whitwell, Derbyshire, Oxley was the younger brother of Chesterfield and Liverpool player Cyril Oxley. Returning to England during World War II Oxley worked for the Worksop Fire Service and continued in the role after the end of war.

References

1907 births
1975 deaths
People from Whitwell, Derbyshire
Footballers from Derbyshire
English footballers
Association football forwards
Chesterfield F.C. players
Sheffield United F.C. players
Sheffield Wednesday F.C. players
Plymouth Argyle F.C. players
Worksop Town F.C. players
Scunthorpe United F.C. players
Stockport County F.C. players
Worksop Town F.C. managers
Wombwell Town F.C. (1940s) players
English Football League players
Leyton Orient F.C. non-playing staff
English football managers
HVV Den Haag managers